Amidabad is a village in Zanjan Province, Iran.

Amidabad may also refer to:
 Amidabad-e Olya, South Khorasan Province
 Amidabad-e Qazi, South Khorasan Province
 Amidabad-e Sofla, South Khorasan Province